Reproductive Sciences is a peer-reviewed medical journal that publishes papers in the fields of obstetrics and gynecology. The co-editors-in-chief are Ayman Al-Hendy and Seung-Yup Ku. It was established in 1994 and is currently published by Springer Nature on behalf of the Society for Reproductive Investigation.

Abstracting and indexing 
The journal is abstracted and indexed in Scopus and the Social Sciences Citation Index. According to the Journal Citation Reports, its 2013 impact factor is 2.23, ranking it 17th out of 30 journals in the category "Reproductive Biology" and 26th out of 79 journals in the category "Obstetrics & Gynecology".

References

External links 
 
 Society for Reproductive Investigation

English-language journals
Obstetrics and gynaecology journals
Monthly journals
Publications established in 1994
Springer Science+Business Media academic journals